Nowhere to Hide is a 1999 South Korean film written and directed by Lee Myung-se.

Synopsis  
The film is set in Incheon in South Korea. A murder is committed, and the cops search for the killer.

Opening up in monochrome but with occasional flashes of colour, the first action scene is a disorientating strobe-like affair. From there the movie proceeds in color, with many innovative editing techniques, including slow-motion, jump cut, step-printed slow motion, "jump dissolves," still frames, and layering images on top of one another.

Cast 
 Park Joong-hoon stars as the obsessive Detective Woo. 
 Ahn Sung-ki
 Jang Dong-gun as Detective Kim.
 Choi Ji-woo

Awards 
Jang Dong-gun won the best supporting actor at the Blue Dragon Film Awards for his role as Detective Kim.

Reception 
The film was a hit at both the inaugural Asia Pacific Film Festival in Sydney, and the Sundance Film Festival, but its American release was limited, brief, and unsuccessful.

References

External links
Nowhere to Hide review at Koreanfilm.org

1999 films
1999 crime thriller films
South Korean action comedy films
South Korean crime thriller films
Police detective films
Films shot in Incheon
Films shot in Busan
Films directed by Lee Myung-se
Best Picture Blue Dragon Film Award winners
1990s Korean-language films
1999 action comedy films
1999 comedy films